Building at 140 Biltmore Avenue is a historic residential building located at Asheville, Buncombe County, North Carolina. It is one of a row of granite apartment buildings on the lower end of Biltmore Avenue. It was built in 1915, and is a two-story, uncoursed rubble granite apartment building covered with a smooth, tan stucco.  It features a low, hipped roof, two story porch on either side, and four chimney stacks.

It was listed on the National Register of Historic Places in 1979.

References

Residential buildings on the National Register of Historic Places in North Carolina
Residential buildings completed in 1915
Buildings and structures in Asheville, North Carolina
National Register of Historic Places in Buncombe County, North Carolina